Robert Hohlbaum (28 August 1886 – 4 February 1955) was an Austrian-German librarian, writer, and playwright. He was born as a son of an industrialist Alois Hohlbaum in what is now Krnov in the Czech Republic, then part of the Austro-Hungarian Empire and known by its German name, Jägerndorf.

Hohlbaum studied at Graz and Vienna and received his doctorate from the University of Vienna in 1910. He gained employment as a scientific librarian, but maintained an avocation as a writer, writing principally for the journal Muskete, along with Mirko Jelusich and Rudolf Hans Bartsch. Hohlbaum was a nationalist and became an officer in the Austrian army during World War I. After the war was over he became involved with the Austrian wing of the right-wing German People's Party.

In 1933 Hohlbaum moved to Germany, where he became a citizen in 1937. He was a friend of Josef Weinheber. He thrived during the Third Reich, becoming first the director of the municipal library at Duisburg and later, in 1942, that of the state library at Weimar (now the Duchess Anna Amalia Library).

In disgrace after the war, Hohlbaum was able after a number of attempts to return to Austria in 1951. He settled first in Vienna, and later in Graz, where he died in 1955. His most significant work after the war ended was a book on Anton Bruckner, Tedeum.

Works
 Der ewige Lenzkampf, 1913
 Deutsche Gedichte. A Cycle, 1916
 Unsterbliche.  Novellas, 1919
 Die Amouren des Magister Döderlein, 1920
 Grenzland, 1921
 Franz Karl Ginzkey. His Life and Work, 1921
 Fallbeil und Reifrock.  New Noverllas, 1921
 Zukunft. Novel, 1922
 Himmlisches Orchester, 1923
 Die deutsche Passion, 1924
 Der wilde Christian. Novel, 1925
 Die Pfingsten von Weimar, 1926
 Die Raben des Kyffhäuser. The Novel of the Burschenschaft und their Age, 1927
 Das Paradies und die Schlange. A Novel from South Tyrol, 1928
 Winterbrautnacht. Novellas, 1929
 Das klingende Gift, 1930
 Deutsches Leid in Österreich, 1930
 Die Stunde der Sterne. A Bruckner Novella, 1930
 König Volk, 1931
 Der Mann aus dem Chaos. A Napoleon Novel, 1933
 Die Flucht in den Krieg, 1935
 Der Held von Kolberg, 1935
 Zweikampf um Deutschland. Novel, 1936
 Fröhlicher Vormärz. Two Novellas, 1936
 Grillparzer, 1938
 Die stumme Schlacht. Novel, 1939
 Der Kurfürst, 1940
 Heroische Rheinreise, Novelle, 1941
 Die Königsparade, 1942
 Balladen vom Geist, 1943
 Das letzte Gefecht, 1943
 Symphonie in drei Sätzen. Novellas, 1943
 Tedeum, 1950
 Jesus-Legende, 1951
 Der Heiratsvermittler, 1953
 Der Zauberstab. Novel of Viennese Musical Life, 1954
 Des reifsten Weines später Segen, 1967

References

 Schneider, Josef: Begegnungen mit Robert Hohlbaum. - In: Sudetendeutscher Kulturalmanach. 6 (1967), S. 41-44

1886 births
1955 deaths
20th-century Austrian novelists
20th-century German novelists
Austrian librarians
German male novelists
Austrian male writers
German librarians
German people of Austrian descent
Austro-Hungarian military personnel of World War I
People from Austrian Silesia
People from Krnov
20th-century German male writers
Austrian emigrants to Germany